Julia Curyło (born 1986, in Warsaw) is a Polish painter and art critic, best known for her art installation Lambs of God at the Marymont metro station in Warsaw. Between 2011 and 2016, her work has been displayed at eight individual exhibitions.

References 

1986 births
Living people
Polish painters
Polish art critics
Polish women painters
Women art critics